"You Wouldn't Steal a Car" is the first sentence of a public service announcement created in July 2004, which was part of the anti-copyright infringement campaign "Piracy. It's a crime." It was created by the Federation Against Copyright Theft and the Motion Picture Association of America in cooperation with the Intellectual Property Office of Singapore, and appeared in theaters internationally from 2004 until 2007, and on many commercial DVDs during the same period as a clip before the main menu or other previews appear, as either an unskippable or skippable video.

The announcement depicts a man committing theft of various objects, and compares these crimes to the unauthorized duplication and distribution of copyrighted materials, such as films. According to the Canadian Internet Policy and Public Interest Clinic, the announcement was unsuccessful, and was largely a source of ridicule. Likewise, a 2022 behavioral economics paper published in The Information Society found the PSAs may have increased piracy rates. By 2009, over 100 parodies of the announcement had been created. It was reported that the music in the announcement was stolen and used without permission. However, one source disputes this, saying the reporting is the result of conflation regarding a different anti-piracy ad that used stolen music.

In popular culture
The advertisement has been parodied in Internet memes, including those using the phrase "You wouldn't download a car." In 2007, The IT Crowd episode "Moss and the German" parodied the advertisement, mirroring its initial points before comparing copyright infringement to increasingly ludicrous crimes and consequences. Finlo Rohrer of the BBC considered this version to be "perhaps the best known" of over 100 parodies of the ad that had been created by 2009. In 2021, the old domain name used by the campaign was purchased and redirected to a YouTube upload of the parody, possibly inspired by a Reddit discussion. An advertisement for the 2008 film Futurama: Bender's Game parodied the campaign by having Bender repeatedly interrupt the narrator to say he would do the crimes described. The advertisement was titled "Downloading Often Is Terrible", or "D.O.I.T".

The Greens-European Free Alliance, in association with Rafilm, released their own parody version of the film to oppose the media industry and government views on existing copyright laws, as well as to educate the public on alternative views about intellectual property. 

In 2017, The Juice Media produced a controversial parody of the video for Australia Day. The video compared the celebration of Australia Day, which marks the arrival of the First Fleet and is often referred to as "Invasion Day" by Indigenous Australians, to celebrating the Nazis' Final Solution, dropping the atomic bomb on Hiroshima and the September 11 attacks.

"You wouldn't screenshot an NFT" is a variant of the "You wouldn't steal a car" meme that satirizes non-fungible tokens, based on the idea that the ease of making digital copies of the work of art associated with an NFT undermines the value of purchasing the NFT.

See also
 Beware of Illegal Video Cassettes
 Don't Copy That Floppy
 Home Recording Rights Coalition
 Home Taping Is Killing Music
 Knock-off Nigel
 Piracy is theft
 Public information film (PIF)
 Public service announcement
 Spin (public relations)
 Steal This Film
 Who Makes Movies?
 You can click, but you can't hide

References

External links
 

Public service announcements
Copyright campaigns

American advertising slogans
2004 neologisms
Motion Picture Association